Chapeshlu District is a district (bakhsh) in Dargaz County, Razavi Khorasan Province, Iran. At the 2006 census, its population was 11,774, in 2,945 families.  The district has one city: Chapeshlu.  The district has two rural districts (dehestan): Miankuh Rural District and Qara Bashlu Rural District.

References 

Districts of Razavi Khorasan Province
Dargaz County